Who Wants to Be a Millionaire? is an international series of television game shows.

Who Wants to Be a Millionaire may also refer to:

Television

 Who Wants to Be a Millionaire? (British game show), the original series
 Who Wants to Be a Millionaire? (American game show) and Who Wants to Be a Super Millionaire?
 Who Wants to Be a Millionaire? (Afghan game show)
 Who Wants to Be a Millionaire? (Australian game show)
 Ke Hotey Chay Kotipoti (Who Wants to Be a Millionaire?), a Bangladeshi game show
 Kaun Banega Crorepati, the Indian version of the game show
 Who Wants to Be a Millionaire? (Irish game show)
 Who Wants to be a Millionaire? (Philippine game show)
 International versions of Who Wants to Be a Millionaire?

Other uses
 "Who Wants to Be a Millionaire?" (song), by Cole Porter, which inspired all subsequent uses
 "Who Wants to Be a Millionaire?" (Only Fools and Horses), an episode of the TV show Only Fools and Horses
 Who Wants to Be a Millionaire – Play It!, a former attraction at Disney's theme parks
 Who Wants to Be a Millionaire (video game), a video game based on the show

See also
 Slumdog Millionaire, a 2009 film adaptation of the novel Q & A which uses the game show as a major plot device
 Q & A (novel), a 2005 novel by Vikas Swarup
 Who Wants to Beat Up a Millionaire?, a video game that parodies the game show